Mihajlo Mitić (born 17 September 1990) is a Serbian professional volleyball player, a former member of the Serbia national team, and the 2011 European Champion. At the professional club level, he plays for PGE Skra Bełchatów.

Honours

Clubs
 CEV Champions League
  2016/2017 – with Sir Sicoma Colussi Perugia

 National championships
 2008/2009  Serbian Cup, with Crvena Zvezda
 2010/2011  Serbian Cup, with Crvena Zvezda
 2011/2012  Serbian SuperCup, with Crvena Zvezda
 2011/2012  Serbian Championship, with Crvena Zvezda
 2012/2013  Serbian SuperCup, with Crvena Zvezda
 2012/2013  Serbian Cup, with Crvena Zvezda
 2012/2013  Serbian Championship, with Crvena Zvezda
 2015/2016  Lebanese Championship, with Al Zahra
 2018/2019  Lebanese Championship, with SpeedBall Chekka

References

External links

 
 Player profile at LegaVolley.it  
 Player profile at PlusLiga.pl  
 Player profile at Volleybox.net

1990 births
Living people
People from Veliko Gradište
Serbian men's volleyball players
Olympic volleyball players of Serbia
Volleyball players at the 2012 Summer Olympics
European Games competitors for Serbia
Volleyball players at the 2015 European Games
European champions for Serbia
Serbian expatriate sportspeople in Italy
Expatriate volleyball players in Italy
Serbian expatriate sportspeople in France
Expatriate volleyball players in France
Serbian expatriate sportspeople in Lebanon
Expatriate volleyball players in Lebanon
Serbian expatriate sportspeople in Russia
Expatriate volleyball players in Russia
Serbian expatriate sportspeople in Cyprus
Expatriate volleyball players in Cyprus
Serbian expatriate sportspeople in the Czech Republic
Expatriate volleyball players in the Czech Republic
Serbian expatriate sportspeople in Poland
Expatriate volleyball players in Poland
Skra Bełchatów players
Setters (volleyball)